Count Edward Raczyński, of the Nałęcz coat-of-arms (April 2, 1786 in Poznań – January 20, 1845 in Zaniemyśl) was a Polish conservative politician, protector of arts, founder of the Raczyński Library in Poznań.

He married Konstancja Potocka in 1817.

References 

 Witold Jakóbczyk, Przetrwać nad Wartą 1815–1914, Dzieje narodu i państwa polskiego, vol. III-55, Krajowa Agencja Wydawnicza, Warszawa 1989

See also
 Edward Raczyński (1891–1993) was a Polish aristocrat, diplomat, politician and the President of Poland in exile (between 1979 and 1986).

1786 births
1845 deaths
Politicians from Poznań
Counts of Poland
People from the Grand Duchy of Posen
Edward
Polish patrons of the arts
Suicides by firearm in Poland